Old One, Old Ones, Great Old One or Great Old Ones may refer to:
 The Great Old Ones, fictional Cthulhu Mythos deities in the works of H. P. Lovecraft
 The Elder Things, fictional Cthulhu Mythos creatures in the works of H. P. Lovecraft
 The Great Old Ones (Call of Cthulhu), an adventure supplement for the Call of Cthulhu role-playing game by Chaosium
 The Old One, a character in The Keys to the Kingdom
 "The Old One", an episode of Playdate
 Old Ones (Palladium Books), a 1984 book written by Kevin Siembieda
 Old Ones (Buffy the Vampire Slayer), fictional demons in Buffy the Vampire Slayer
 Old Ones, mystical beings in The Dark Is Rising Sequence
 Old Ones, an ancient race of advanced, god-like aliens in the Warhammer Fantasy setting
 Old Ones or Elder Bairns, fictional creatures in Blood-C

See also
 Ancient One (disambiguation)
 Elder race, a fictional ancient race of beings